CCOA may refer to:

 California Correctional Officers Association, former name of the California Correctional Peace Officers Association
 Catholic Apostolic Church of Antioch, an independent Catholic church not in communion with Rome
 Chinese Cereals and Oils Association, a national scientific and technical association
 Clear Channel Outdoor Americas, an outdoor advertising company
 IIHF Challenge Cup of Asia, an international ice hockey competition